Kissidougou (N’ko: ߞߛߌ߬ߘߎ߯; pronounced like Kiss-eh-dow-goo) is a city in southern Guinea.  It is the capital of in the Kissidougou Prefecture.  Following intensified conflicts in Sierra Leone and Liberia during the fall and winter of 2000, many people from the city of Guéckédou fled to Kissidougou and stayed. As of 2014 it had a population of 102,675 people.

The town is served by Kissidougou Airport, and the Niandan river flows past the city.

Kissidougou City 
Founded in the eighteenth century, the city is known for the coffee plantations and large expanses of nearby forest.  Other attractions in the city include a museum, a football team and a major bridge.

Although the market is open 7 days a week, it is especially busy on Tuesdays.
The word Kissidougou means a place of refuge in Malinke, Kouranko [Malinke Sub-group] are the largest local ethnic group.

The Guinean musician and singer Mory Kanté was from Kissidougou.

Ethnicity 

Besides the dominant Kouranko and Kissi there are many other ethnic groups living in Kissidougou, including the Malinké and Fula. Many Loma people live in this region as well, especially between Kissidougou and Macenta.

Climate 
Kissidougou has a tropical savanna climate (Köppen climate classification Aw).

Refugee crisis 
Throughout the 1990s, the government of Guinea, in cooperation with the United Nations High Commission for Refugees (UNHCR), provided international protection and assistance to Sierra Leonian and Liberian refugees residing along Guinea's southern border.  In December 2000 and January 2001, a series of cross border attacks resulted in a massive shift in refugee (and Guinean) populations.  Many fled to the Kissidougou and N'Zérékoré Prefectures in the Forest Region of Guinea.  In February 2001, relocation of the Gueckédou and Faranah camps began with the transfer of temporary refugee settlements to new camps in the Albadariah sub-prefecture of Kissidougou.

Throughout 2001, there were more than 400,000 refugees in Guinea, many in Kissidougou.  This massive influx of Sierra Leonian refugees placed great stress on the government of Guinea as well as upon international aid organizations' ability to provide a stable, secure refuge.

There were widespread accounts of sexual violence throughout the camps, despite the best efforts of the international relief organizations.

References 

 
Sub-prefectures of the Faranah Region